Asterophrys eurydactyla is a species of frog in the family Microhylidae. It is endemic to New Guinea and known from the Onin Peninsula in Western New Guinea (Indonesia), and from the Star Mountains in the Western Province in Papua New Guinea, close to the border with Western New Guinea; there are some doubts whether this easternmost record is conspecific with A. eurydactyla. Common name Danowaria callulops frog has been proposed for this species.

Asterophrys eurydactyla occurs in tropical lowland, hill, and montane rainforests, including a limestone cave. There are no known major threats to this species. It is not known to occur in any protected areas.

References

eurydactyla
Endemic fauna of New Guinea
Amphibians of Papua New Guinea
Amphibians of Western New Guinea
Taxa named by Richard G. Zweifel
Amphibians described in 1972
Taxonomy articles created by Polbot